Therman "Sonny" Fisher (November 13, 1931 in Chandler, Texas – October 8, 2005 in Houston, Texas) was an American singer, songwriter, and guitarist.

He was inducted into the Rockabilly Hall of Fame.

External links
 Sonny Fisher obituary from The Guardian

American country singer-songwriters
Singer-songwriters from Texas
American rockabilly guitarists
American male guitarists
Musicians from Houston
American country rock singers
American rockabilly musicians
American rock singers
Starday Records artists
1931 births
2005 deaths
20th-century American singers
20th-century American guitarists
Guitarists from Texas
People from Henderson County, Texas
Country musicians from Texas
20th-century American male musicians
American male singer-songwriters